Gustave Louis Ballister (born 2 October 1928) is a Belgian fencer. He competed at the 1952 and 1960 Summer Olympics.

References

External links
 

1928 births
Possibly living people
Belgian male fencers
Belgian foil fencers
Belgian sabre fencers
Olympic fencers of Belgium
Fencers at the 1952 Summer Olympics
Fencers at the 1960 Summer Olympics